Peter J. Murphy (August 7, 1860 – December 25, 1916) was an American farmer and politician.

Born in the town of Cato, Manitowoc County, Wisconsin, Murphy was a farmer. He served as chairman of the Cato Town Board and on the school board. He served in the Wisconsin State Assembly and was a Democrat. Murphy died of pneumonia at his home in Cato, Wisconsin from pneumonia. He declined to be renominated for re-election to office.

Notes

1860 births
1916 deaths
People from Cato, Wisconsin
Farmers from Wisconsin
Mayors of places in Wisconsin
School board members in Wisconsin
19th-century American politicians
Deaths from pneumonia in Wisconsin
Democratic Party members of the Wisconsin State Assembly